, provisional designation , is a stony Florian asteroid from the inner regions of the asteroid belt, approximately 3 kilometers in diameter. It was discovered on 16 November 1981, by astronomers at Perth Observatory in Bickley, Australia.

Orbit and classification 

The stony S-type asteroid is a member of the Flora family, one of the largest groups of asteroids in the main-belt. It orbits the Sun at a distance of 1.8–2.6 AU once every 3 years and 4 months (1,206 days).

Its orbit has an eccentricity of 0.18 and an inclination of 3° with respect to the ecliptic. A first precovery was taken at Palomar in 1951, extending the body's observation arc by 30 years prior to its official discovery observation at Bickley.

Physical characteristics 

In December 2014, astronomer Maurice Clark obtained a rotational lightcurve from photometric observations at Preston Gott Observatory. Lightcurve analysis gave an ambiguous rotation period of 18.3980 hours with a brightness variation of 0.41 magnitude, suggesting a non-spheroidal shape. The alternative period solution is 9.14 hours with an amplitude of 0.32 magnitude. The results supersede a previously obtained period of 5.547 hours.

Diameter and albedo 

According to the survey carried out by NASA's Wide-field Infrared Survey Explorer with its subsequent NEOWISE mission, the asteroid measures between 2.44 and 3.00 kilometers in diameter, and its surface has an albedo between 0.283 and 0.428. The Collaborative Asteroid Lightcurve Link assumes an intermediate albedo of 0.24 – derived from 8 Flora, the largest member and namesake of this asteroid family – and calculates a diameter of 3.11 kilometers with an absolute magnitude of 14.7.

Numbering and naming 

This minor planet was numbered by the Minor Planet Center on 2 February 1999. As of 2018, it has not been named.

References

External links 
 Asteroid Lightcurve Database (LCDB), query form (info )
 Dictionary of Minor Planet Names, Google books
 Asteroids and comets rotation curves, CdR – Observatoire de Genève, Raoul Behrend
 Discovery Circumstances: Numbered Minor Planets (5001)-(10000) – Minor Planet Center
 

009928
009928
19811116